Callulina kanga, the Kanga warty frog, is a frog in the family Brevicipitidae endemic to Tanzania. It has been observed in the Kanga Forest Reserve.

References

Frogs of Africa
Endemic fauna of Tanzania
Amphibians described in 2010
kanga